Qoʻshtepa is a district of Fergana Region in Uzbekistan. The capital lies at the village Langar. The district consists of 14 urban-type settlements (Boltakoʻl, Gishtmon, Doʻrmon, Katta Beshkapa, Qizil ariq, Qorajiyda, Qorakaltak, Qumtepa, Quyi Oqtepa, Sarmozor, Xotinariq, Shahartepa, Eshonguzar, Yangiariq) and 15 rural communities (incl. Langar).

References

Districts of Uzbekistan
Fergana Region